Spellbinder is a 1995 English-language fantasy adventure science fiction children's television series, co-produced between Australia and Poland, and filmed in both countries. The series follows the adventures of Sydney high-schooler Paul Reynolds (Zbych Trofimiuk) as he is accidentally stranded in a parallel world where the industrial revolution never happened. Only a small number of people there have technology – the "Spellbinders" – and they pretend it is magic and use it to rule over everyone else, manipulating people's fear and ignorance. Paul, with the help of a local girl called Riana (Gosia Piotrowska), uses his wits and his own knowledge of science to survive, whilst his high-school friends try to rescue him.

The series has 26 episodes of 30 minutes each, and was produced by Film Australia and Telewizja Polska, in association with the Australian Children's Television Foundation (ACTF), who provide accompanying educational material for the series.

Spellbinder was shot on location in Australia (Sydney, and the Blue Mountains), and in Poland where most scenes of the parallel world were filmed (in Kraków-Częstochowa Upland, Ogrodzieniec, Zawiercie, Czocha Castle, and Książ). Czocha Castle was used as the Spellbinder's castle with Książ Castle serving for certain interior shots. The ruins of Ogrodzieniec Castle were used as the ruins of the Old Spellbinder's castle.

Spellbinder won the Australian Film Institute's Award for Best Children's Television Drama in 1996. The series was also novelised by the creators, Mark Shirrefs and John Thomson, as Spellbinder Book 1: Riana's World and Spellbinder Book 2: Paul's World.

Spellbinder was followed by a second series, called Spellbinder: Land of the Dragon Lord, in which Heather Mitchell and Rafał Zwierz reprised their roles as the Spellbinder Ashka and her apprentice Gryvon respectively.

Synopsis
A group of teenagers go on a school camp in the Blue Mountains in Australia. While at the camp, Paul Reynolds accidentally goes into a parallel universe. This other world is inhabited by a more hierarchical and technologically different society, ruled by a group of people known as Spellbinders. Paul meets a girl there named Riana, and they become friends.

The Spellbinders have discovered the power to create and manipulate static electricity. They fly in gigantic copper-coloured machines that utilise large rotating orange crystals, presumably creating some form of magnetic levitation. The Spellbinders often use their power for good, but some abuse this power and use their discoveries for malevolence. One such malevolent Spellbinder is Ashka, who often manages to hide her true nature. Common people are often "banished" for their misdeeds, and sometimes Spellbinders are banished, also, if they are proven to have done wrong.

There is tension from Paul's forays into the land of the Spellbinders and his attempts to return to his own universe, and also from conversations Paul has with his friends across the barrier between the two universes. Paul and Riana's escapes also add tension, as do the interactions between Spellbinders.

Paul is eventually able to travel back home, but he is forced to take Riana with him in order to save her. Later, when Paul is able to take Riana back home, the Spellbinder Ashka follows Paul as he later returns home. Ashka seeks the unwitting help of Paul's father in making her a new high-tech 'flying suit' to replace her power suit in order to make her more powerful than the other Spellbinders.

However, Paul manages to expose her scheme and defeat Ashka, who is returned as an outcast to the Spellbinder world, while Riana becomes the new apprentice to Correon. In order to keep the Spellbinder world safe from the more advanced people from "modern" world, the gateway between the two universes is closed permanently.

Cast and characters

Main
 Zbych Trofimiuk as Paul Reynolds – a teenage boy from Sydney, New South Wales, Australia. His life was normal until a prank at a camp went wrong and he ended up in the land of the Spellbinders. At first, Paul was unsure of how to react to the new world, but he settled in quite quickly and was able to discover Ashka's plot to rule the Spellbinders. Paul has some rough military skills, which, combined with the scientific knowledge from his father, makes him able to defeat Ashka.
 Gosia Piotrowska as Riana – she lives in the Spellbinder world. Her life was normal until the arrival of Paul. Despite getting off to a somewhat rocky start (Paul being mistaken for a Marauder), however Riana realises that Paul is not a Marauder after he rescues her from drowning in a river and returns her belongings. Riana quickly becomes Paul's friend. She has very good survival skills and can use bolas and a spear. Riana cares very much for her family and is upset when she realises that they may be in danger. In Paul's world, Riana is able to use some of her survival skills to help a newfound friend, and is known as "Paul's cousin from Iceland". Due to her role in Ashka's defeat, Correon rewards Riana by making her his apprentice.
 Brian Rooney as Alex Katsonis – Paul's best friend who knows the truth about what happened to Paul and tries his best to bring him back. In the course of the series, he also develops a relationship with his classmate Katrina, even though they are basically as opposite as they can be. Alex has an older brother, who is a mechanic but gets fired for unspecified reasons.
 Michela Noonan as Katrina Muggleton – brought up by strict parents, Katrina is academically smart at school but has tendencies of naivete. Believing that the Mount Lara lights do exist, she travels up to the cave and is the only other person to both see and believe Paul's disappearance. She realises that the radios can be used to communicate and is able to succeed in helping to bring Paul home. In the second half of the season, Katrina becomes a friend to Riana, taking her shopping and introducing her to the trends of fashion. However, Katrina is easily tricked by Ashka into helping her.
 Heather Mitchell as Ashka – a Spellbinder. She mistakes Paul for a Marauder at first, throwing a power bolt at him, then, she realises, much to her surprise, that he is unaffected (the rubber soles of his sneakers insulated him) and chases after him. When she meets Paul at the castle and learns about fireworks, she blackmails Paul into giving her the secret of gunpowder, by holding the life of Riana and her family over his head. Paul tricks her twice and Ashka winds up in Paul's world. In Paul's world, Ashka is unfamiliar with all the new sights and sounds and this proves to be a slight disadvantage, however she winds up working with Paul's father and creating a new power suit to take over the Spellbinder world. Ashka is ruthless and intimidating, and has the ability to create lies on the spot. Ashka misuses her power and authority for her own gain, and this leads to her downfall.
 Andrew McFarlane as Brian Reynolds – Paul's father.  A scientist, Brian is usually more wrapped up in his work than his family, but eventually settles down. He refuses to believe that Paul is in another world. Even after Paul returns home, Brian instead believes his son is suffering a trauma. A single father, he shows a romantic interest in Ashka, not realising she is a Spellbinder or that she plans to overthrow the Regents. He helps her create a new power suit. He realises Paul has been telling the truth when he meets Riana and opens his eyes to Ashka's true nature after she threatens Paul. When he realises his mistake, however, his knowledge helps bring Ashka down.
 Krzysztof Kumor as Correon – a Spellbinder and senior Regent. His studies are on how to repair flying ships and power suits. At first, he does not believe Paul and his claims about where he comes from. When he meets Riana, however, and she shows him the technology from Paul's world via his camcorder, Correon realises that Paul is telling the truth and teams up with Paul and Riana to get Paul home. He calls Ashka a liar and is challenged by her, but he loses (because Ashka, desperate to get rid of Correon, cheated by having Gryvon sabotage his power suit.) and is stripped of his position and sent to the Wastelands where he is rescued by Zander (a supposed Marauder). Correon also reveals Ashka's true nature to the Regents, by showing them Paul's camera, which shows them Ashka's actual motives. Correon is then reinstated as Spellbinder and senior Regent. He also is the one who introduces the Regents to a "Marauder" and plays a part in Ashka's downfall in the Spellbinder world.
 Rafał Zwierz as Gryvon – Ashka's apprentice. The son of the Clayhill Summoner and Ashka's co-conspirator, Gryvon is selfish and sycophantic, and follows Ashka's orders to the full. He is stripped of his apprenticeship after Ashka escapes and is punished by having to help repair Riana's family cottage, which was burnt by Ashka. Despite the fact he is no longer an apprentice, he still assists Ashka in her plans, but in the end he is exiled just like her.

Recurring
 Joachim Lamża as Lukan – Spellbinder Regent
 Hanna Dunowska as Marna – Spellbinder Regent
 Piotr Adamczyk as Zander – a native boy of the Spellbinder world who is banished for making a flying toy (with Paul's help), he later becomes a Marauder. He is the first of the Marauders to discover that the old Spellbinders were responsible for the Darkness and not the Marauders. Correon introduces him to the Regents as a real Marauder. He is impressed by Paul's scientific knowledge on flight.
 Julia Biczysko as Arla – Riana's younger sister
 Stanislaw Brejdygant as the Clayhill Summoner. He is Gryvon's father and is in charge of keeping things order in Clayhill (the village where Riana and her family live). When Paul arrives in the Land of the Spellbinders, he is the first person Paul meets. The Summoner mistakes Paul for a Marauder, and Paul accidentally steals his eyestone. He is unaware of Gryvon helping Ashka in her plan to rule the Spellbinders, and is shocked when she threatens to burn his village.
 Erland Buchan as Jal – Riana's younger brother
 Georgina Fisher as Christine Reynolds – Paul's younger sister, who helps keep Riana secret. Christine often expresses the wish for a mother and tries to match-make with her father and her baby-sitter, Gina.
 Andrzej Grabarczyk as Bron – Riana's father. He lies to the Summoner that Paul is his nephew.
 Sława Michalewska as Maran – Riana's mother. She does not trust Paul at first (having him sleep in the barn), but she eventually trusts him after he saves Jal from drowning via CPR. After Paul steals a power suit from the castle, Maran allows the Summoner to detain him. However, after hearing of Ashka's plans for her family, Maran has a change of heart and helps Paul escape by drugging the Summoner and his men with a sleeping drug she slipped into their tea.
 Judy Morris as Mrs. Muggleton – Katrina's mother, she is strict and overprotective of her daughter. In the series finale, she realises that Katrina and Alex have been telling the truth, and apologises to the both of them for not believing them.
 Christian Mcveigh as Mac – Spellbinder Regent
 Piotr Makowski as Kurn - the leader of the Marauders.

The Spellbinder's world
Very little is revealed about the history of the Spellbinder's world. At some point in the distant past, a disaster befell the planet, leaving their land surrounded by a wasteland where nothing can survive. They refer to this disaster as "the Darkness," and the ancestors of a group called the Marauders (raiders who live on the outskirts of their society, bordering on the wastelands) are blamed for the past catastrophe. It is later learned that the Ancient Spellbinders were the ones actually responsible for the disaster, brought about by their own intellectual arrogance and desire for increasingly powerful weapons. Paul, the visitor from our world, speculates that "the Darkness" may have been the result of a nuclear winter, although this is not further elaborated upon. Regent Correon, with Paul's help, discovers an ancient book that describes an experiment of the ancient Spellbinders that went horribly wrong, but this book is destroyed by Ashka before more can be learned.

The Ancient Spellbinders were technologically advanced, although their everyday lives were relatively simple by the standards of Paul's world. They lived in stone castles and relied on traditional agriculture for food, but they also developed electromagnetic power suits, long-distance radio communication, and metallic ships that used powerful magnetic fields in order to fly. Most of their knowledge was lost after the disaster, and today's Spellbinders only have a limited understanding of the science their technology is based on. Their flying ships and power suits are falling into disarray as they frantically search to rediscover the knowledge lost to them.

The Spellbinder world is governed by a council of three Regents who reside in the Spellbinder castle. The Regents are indifferent to the plight of the people outside their castle, enforce a very rigid code of laws designed to protect their power over the land, and ultimately are reluctant to believe Paul's claims about where he comes from. They imprison anyone who discovers or applies the principles of science, such as Zander, a native boy who makes a toy that can fly. The basis of their power over the people is their technology, and they are ruthless in their desire to prevent anyone else from understanding it. People who are exiled to the wastelands are sometimes saved by, and then join, the group of raiders known as Marauders.

The people of the Spellbinder world are ignorant of the true nature of the Spellbinders' technology. To them, their power suits and flying ships are magic. The Spellbinders exploit this belief in order to maintain control over the people and use them for labour. Some people are allowed into the Spellbinder castle as servants, while exceptionally bright ones are taken on as apprentices to the Spellbinders. There is some degree of nepotism involved in the process though, as Gryvon is clearly only chosen to be an apprentice because his father is the Summoner of Clayhill.

The Spellbinders are beset with internal conflict due to the deterioration of their technology. Because there are only a limited number of power suits and flying ships still in operation, only a select few can be Spellbinders at any given time. At one point, a major dispute is legally settled by a ritualised duel in which Spellbinders fire power bolts at each other; such duels were noted to be somewhat archaic, however. The loser of such a match is stripped of their power suit and exiled to the wastelands to die. The same punishment is also given to anyone who violates the law against using science.

Paul's visit may have changed the balance of power in the Spellbinder world. Regent Correon invites Riana to be his new apprentice, and Ashka and Gryvon are punished by being sent to a labour camp (as seen in Spellbinder: Land of the Dragon Lord) for their abuse of power. Although Correon was previously only interested in rediscovering the secrets of the Ancient Spellbinders, he now seems sympathetic to the problems of the people outside his castle, even deciding to share the Spellbinder's knowledge with everyone outside the castle. The rigid hierarchy that defines the Spellbinder society may therefore be weakening, as Correon believes that 'things must change around here'. However, Paul decides that future contact between the two worlds should be avoided in order to prevent Riana's world from being exploited by his own.

Spellbinder technology

Power suits
The power suit is the central piece of Spellbinder technology. It is powered by a set of power stones, which can be recharged in the castle complex. By rubbing the cuffs of the suit together, a Spellbinder can generate and discharge a power bolt. In combat, the power suit can be worn with a small shield capable of deflecting power bolts. Although the technology is never fully explained, it is implied that the power suit increases the voltage of energy stored within the power stones and releases it in the form of static electricity. Curiously, while usually capable of immobilising or causing injury to anyone on the receiving end of a bolt, Paul survived a bolt impact unscathed at one point; a feat he put down to the rubber soles of his footwear insulating him and preventing the bolt from grounding through him.

Because the suit's copper circuitry is mounted outside the suit, it is easily disabled by splashing it with water, causing a short circuit. The new power suit (named 'Prototype KX4') created by Brian in Paul's world is able to repel the Earth's magnetic field, allowing it to fly. Its circuitry has also been sealed against being shorted out by exposure to water and power bolts are generated and discharged with the press of a button on the suit's gauntlet, rather than striking wrist plates together to generate the static electricity. The keypad on the suit's gauntlet can also control machines, such as a television and even an elevator. The new power suit however has a weakness of strong magnetic fields, just like the powersuits in the Land of the Spellbinders.

Power stones
Power stones are the primary power source for Spellbinder technology. Spellbinders get power stones from their lands. They are used to generate the power bolts released by power suits, and they are also used to create the magnetic fields that power flying ships. They are generally small, rectangular stones with a yellowish-hue, although the power stones found in flying ships are much larger. Power stones can be recharged by infusing them with electricity, which is done in the lower levels of the Spellbinders' castle.

Summoning towers
Summoning towers are large metal towers that resemble electrical transformers and radio towers. The primary purpose of the summoning tower is to contact the Spellbinders when they are needed. An eyestone is placed into a cradle at the base of the tower, which presumably amplifies the signal it generates. The summoning towers also produce a magnetic field used to give flying ships their 'lift' (as evidenced when Paul shorts the main power stone in the castle, causing all flying ships to crash) and can be used as a landing pad for the flying ships.

Eyestones
Spellbinders communicate with each other with a handheld eyestone. The device has an outer lattice bearing the Spellbinder insignia, and opens to reveal a small circuit board. An eyestone creates a weak radio signal, similar to a walkie-talkie. For communicating over great distances, an eyestone must be connected to a summoning tower. Village summoners are the only people besides the Spellbinders who are permitted to use eyestones.

Flying ships
The Spellbinders travel large distances in their metal flying ships. Unlike aeroplanes, which operate on aerodynamic principles, flying ships generate lift through powerful magnetic fields. Each flying ship is equipped with a pair of large power stones on either side, which rotate slowly as the ship moves. This motion creates a magnetic field powerful enough to repel against another magnetic field created by the summoning towers. Flying ships can be used for transportation and also to dust crops with pesticide. Although the technology that powers them is impressive, flying ships generally move somewhat slowly. By the time of Paul's visit to the Spellbinder's world, only six remain in operation.

Compass
Spellbinders use a small magnetic compass to navigate when travelling on foot or horseback. The compass contains a gyro device that is pulled into motion with a piece of string. The arrow of the compass then moves to detect north.

Episodes

Awards and nominations

Australian Film Institute Awards

Australian Writers' Guild

Logie Awards

Broadcast 
The original Spellbinder series ran on Australia's Nine Network between January and July 1995. Internationally, the series was shown in the United States on The Disney Channel beginning on 5 February 1996, and the sequel appeared on Fox Family Channel beginning in 1998. Due to a license dispute, The Disney Channel airing used a different opening and closing sequence.

The series was screened in the United Kingdom and Ireland on ITV and Network 2's The Den respectively in 1996 (only episodes 1–13 aired on ITV). The series was aired in Pakistan by Pakistan Television. The series was aired in Sri Lanka by Sri Lanka Rupavahini Corporation as "Maya Bandana" "මායාා බන්ධන" (Season 1) and "Makara Rajadahana" "මකර රජදහන" (Season 2). Owing to its utmost popularity it was telecasted more than five times in Sri Lanka over the years. The most recent telecast was in April 2020

DVD releases and streaming services 
The series is available to stream on Netflix in Australia and Amazon Prime Video in the United States and Germany.

References

External links
 Spellbinder at Australian Children's Television Foundation
 

1995 Australian television series debuts
1995 Australian television series endings
Australian adventure television series
Australian children's television series
Australian children's fantasy television series
Australian science fiction television series
Children's adventure television series
Nine Network original programming
Polish children's television series
S
Television series about parallel universes
Television series about teenagers
Television shows set in Sydney